Lal is an Indo-Iranian surname and given name, which means "darling", "precious", or "beloved", from the Sanskrit lala ("cajoling"). In addition, Lal means "garnet" or "ruby" in Persian, "ruby" in Pashto, and "red" in Hindustani and Bengali. The name Lal may refer to mainly Kayastha as well as used by other communities:

Surname
Lal is a surname related to honorific title Lal, and is found among various social groups and castes.  The surname is also common in the Indian diaspora.

Notable people
Akash Lal (born 1940), Indian cricketer
Amrit Lal (1940s Southern Punjab cricketer)
Amrit Lal (1960s Southern Punjab cricketer)
Ananda Lal (born 1955), Indian theatre critic
Arun Lal (born 1955), Indian cricketer
B. B. Lal (1921–2022), Indian archaeologist
Bansi Lal (1927–2006), Indian politician and two-time chief minister of Haryana
Bhai Nand Lal (1633–1713), Persian poet
Bhajan Lal (1930–2011), Indian politician 
Bihari Lal (1595–1663), Indian poet
Brij Lal, Indo-Fijian politician
Brij Lal (historian) (born 1952), Fijian historian
Chatur Lal (1925–1965), Indian tabla player
Chaudhary Devi Lal (1909–2001), Indian politician who twice served as Chief Minister of Haryana
Chuni Lal (1968 - 2007) Indian Army soldier
Deepak Lal (born 1940), British economist
Durga Lal (1948 - 1990), Indian Kathak dancer
Gobind Behari Lal (1889–1982), Indian journalist
Jean Paul Lal (born 1988), Malayalam film director
Kishan Lal (1917 – 1980), Indian field hockey player.
K. S. Lal (1920–2002), Indian historian
Lallu Lal (1763–1835), Indian writer
Madan Lal (born 1951), Indian cricket player and coach
Mohanlal (born 1960), Indian Actor
Nidhin Lal (born 1991), Indian footballer
Padma Narsey Lal (born 1951), Fijian ecological economist
Pancham Lal (born 1951), Indian Administrative Service officer 
Pratap Chandra Lal (1916–1982), Indian air marshal
Prerna Lal (born 1984), Fijian writer
Priyaa Lal (born 1993), British Indian actress. 
Purshotam Lal (born 1954), Indian cardiologist
Purushottama Lal (1929–2010), Indian writer
Ram Lal (born 1957), Indian politician
Sanjay Lal (born 1969), American football coach
Sunder Lal, Indian freedom fighter
Vikram Lal (born 1942), Indian businessman
Vinay Lal (born 1961), Indian historian

Given name
Lal Behari Dey (1824–1892), Indian journalist
Lal Jayawardena (1935–2004), Sri Lankan economist 
Lal Jose (born 1966), Indian filmmaker
Lal Khan (born 1956), Pakistani political activist
Lal Krishna Advani (born 1927), Indian politician
Lal Mia (died 1960), Bengali politician
Lal Thanhawla (born 1942), Indian politician
Lal Thanzara, Indian politician
Lal Wickrematunge (born 1950), Sri Lankan businessman

See also
 Lal (disambiguation)

References

Indian surnames
Indian given names
Surnames of Indian origin